Clatteringshaws Loch is a freshwater reservoir in the historical county of The Stewartry of Kirkcudbright in  Dumfries and Galloway, Scotland. It was created by damming the Galloway River Dee as part of the Galloway Hydro Electric Scheme.

The Forestry Commission maintain a visitors' centre by the loch to welcome visitors to Galloway Forest Park.

See also
List of reservoirs and dams in the United Kingdom

External links
 Recreation at Clatteringshaws at the Forestry Commission website

Reservoirs in Dumfries and Galloway